Boz Quch-e Sofla (also Romanized as Boz Qūch-e Soflá, Buzqūch Sofla, and Bozghooch Sofla; also known as Boz Qūch-e Pā’īn) is a village in Kahshang Rural District, in the Central District of Birjand County, South Khorasan Province, Iran. At the 2006 census, its population was 34, in 12 families.

References 

Populated places in Birjand County